The first season of the American political drama television series The West Wing aired in the United States on NBC from September 22, 1999, to May 17, 2000, and consisted of 22 episodes.

Cast

Main cast 

 Rob Lowe as Sam Seaborn, Deputy White House Communications Director (22 episodes)
 Moira Kelly as Mandy Hampton, Media Consultant (20 episodes)
 Dulé Hill as Charlie Young, Personal Aide to the President (19 episodes)
 Allison Janney as C. J. Cregg, White House Press Secretary (22 episodes)
 Richard Schiff as Toby Ziegler, White House Communications Director (22 episodes)
 John Spencer as Leo McGarry, White House Chief of Staff (22 episodes)
 Bradley Whitford as Josh Lyman, White House Deputy Chief of Staff (22 episodes)
 Martin Sheen as Josiah Bartlet, President of the United States (22 episodes)

Recurring cast 
 Janel Moloney as Donna Moss, assistant to Josh Lyman (22 episodes)
 Nicole Robinson as Margaret Hooper, Assistant to Chief of Staff McGarry (18 episodes)
 Kathryn Joosten as Dolores Landingham, President Bartlet's executive secretary (17 episodes)
 Timothy Busfield as Danny Concannon, senior White House correspondent for The Washington Post (14 episodes)
 Elisabeth Moss as Zoey Bartlet, the youngest of the President's three daughters (7 episodes)
 Allison Smith as Mallory O'Brien, Leo McGarry's daughter (5 episodes)
 John Amos as Admiral Percy Fitzwallace, Chairman of the Joint Chiefs of Staff (5 episodes)
 Tim Matheson as John Hoynes, Vice President of the United States (5 episodes)
 Lisa Edelstein as Laurie, law student and part-time high priced call girl Sam sleeps with in the pilot (5 episodes)
 Jorja Fox as Gina Toscano, the Secret Service agent assigned to Zoey (5 episodes)
 Marlee Matlin as Joey Lucas, a Democratic political consultant (4 episodes)
 Stockard Channing as Abbey Bartlet, First Lady of the United States (3 episodes)
 Kathleen York as Andrea Wyatt, Congresswoman from Maryland's 5th district and ex-wife of Toby Ziegler (3 episodes)

Plot 
The first season, which begins in the middle of Bartlet's first year in office, is loaded with images of a West Wing "stuck in neutral" and powerless to govern. Several episodes (notably "Five Votes Down" and "Mr. Willis of Ohio") feature the White House desperately digging for a backdoor through which to pass a particular piece of legislation. This powerlessness ends in "Let Bartlet Be Bartlet" when Leo and the president finally agree to fight any battle they believe to be important, even if they are not sure they can win. The season ends with a cliffhanger assassination attempt with an ominous call over a Secret Service radio: "Who's been hit?! Who's been hit?!"

Episodes

Reception

Critical response
The first season of The West Wing received positive reviews, and scored a Metacritic rating of 79 out of 100, based on 23 reviews. On Rotten Tomatoes, the season has an approval rating of 96% with an average score of 8.3 out of 10 based on 46 reviews. The website's critical consensus reads, "The West Wing is a gripping fantasy of lawmakers and government operatives looking to make a difference, presenting an idealized vision of politicking that audiences can strive toward."

Accolades
The first season received 18 Emmy Award nominations for the 52nd Primetime Emmy Awards, winning a total of 9 awards. It won for Outstanding Drama Series, Outstanding Supporting Actor in a Drama Series (Richard Schiff), Outstanding Supporting Actress in a Drama Series (Allison Janney), Outstanding Writing for a Drama Series (Aaron Sorkin and Rick Cleveland for "In Excelsis Deo"), Outstanding Directing for a Drama Series (Thomas Schlamme for "Pilot"), Outstanding Main Title Theme Music (W. G. Snuffy Walden), Outstanding Cinematography for a Single Camera Series (Thomas Del Ruth), Outstanding Art Direction for a Single Camera Series, and Outstanding Casting for a Drama Series. Notable nominations included Martin Sheen for Outstanding Lead Actor in a Drama Series, John Spencer for Outstanding Supporting Actor in a Drama Series, Stockard Channing for Outstanding Supporting Actress in a Drama Series, and Aaron Sorkin for Outstanding Writing for a Drama Series for "Pilot".

Thomas Del Ruth received a nomination from the American Society of Cinematographers for the pilot episode.

References

General references

External links
 

 
1999 American television seasons
2000 American television seasons